Jonathan Lalrawngbawla (born 13 November 1997) is an Indian professional footballer who plays as a forward for NorthEast United FC in the Indian Super League. He is popularly known as Jojo.

Career
Born in Mizoram, Lalrawngbawla is a product of the Aizawl Academy and played for the club in the Aizawl District Football Association 1st Division. He started playing for the Aizawl first-team during their Mizoram Premier League campaign in 2016.

Lalrawngbawla made his professional debut for the club in the I-League on 4 March 2017 in Aizawl's match against Mumbai. He came on in second half stoppage time as Aizawl won 2–0.

Career statistics

References

1994 births
Living people
People from Mizoram
Indian footballers
Aizawl FC players
Association football forwards
Footballers from Mizoram
Mizoram Premier League players
I-League players